Live! is a live concert video from the British alternative rock band Bush. It was filmed on 18 September 2011 in Portland, Oregon while the band was touring in support of their album The Sea of Memories. The video was released on DVD and Blu-ray formats on 1 March 2013.

Track listing
Little Things
I Believe in You
Greedy Fly
The Sound of Winter
Everything Zen
The Chemicals Between Us
All My Life
The People That We Love
All Night Doctors
Swallowed
The Afterlife
Machinehead
Alien
Glycerine
Comedown

Bonus Acoustic Set
Little Things
The Sound of Winter
Be Still My Love
Comedown
Glycerine

Bonus Music Videos
The Sound of Winter
Baby Come Home

External links
Official Bush Website

References

2013 video albums
Live video albums